Tretioscincus agilis, the smooth tegu, is a species of lizard in the family Gymnophthalmidae. It is found in Guyana, Suriname, French Guiana, Brazil, Venezuela, and Colombia.

References

Tretioscincus
Reptiles of Brazil
Reptiles of Colombia
Reptiles of French Guiana
Reptiles of Guyana
Reptiles of Suriname
Reptiles of Venezuela
Reptiles described in 1916
Taxa named by Alexander Grant Ruthven